Netball was one of the sports contested at the 2022 Commonwealth Games, held in Birmingham, England. This was the seventh staging of netball at the Commonwealth Games since its inclusion in 1998, and the second staging within England specifically.

The tournament took place between 29 July and 7 August 2022.

Schedule
The competition schedule for the netball tournament was as follows:

Detailed fixtures were first released on 12 November 2021, then updated with the full complement of qualified teams on 4 March 2022.

Venue
The tournament was originally set to be held in Coventry Arena. However, the sport's heightened profile in light of England winning the 2018 tournament led to the National Exhibition Centre being chosen instead.

Five other sports - badminton, boxing, para powerlifting, table tennis, and weightlifting - will also take place in the venue.

Qualification
Twelve nations from at least four CGF regions qualify for the netball tournament at the 2022 Commonwealth Games:
 The host nation.
 The top five nations in the World Netball Rankings as of 28 July 2021, excluding the host nation.
 The top six nations as of 31 January 2022, excluding nations already qualified.

Group stage

Group A

Group B

Classification matches

Eleventh place match

Ninth place match

Seventh place match

Fifth place match

Medal round

Semi-finals

Bronze medal match

Gold medal match

Final standings

Medallists

References

External links
 Official website: 2022 Commonwealth Games – Netball

 
2022
netball
2022 in netball
International netball competitions hosted by England
Common